Renate Götschl (born 6 August 1975) is an Austrian former alpine ski racer. She is a two-time individual World Champion in the combined (1997) and downhill (1999), and has won a total of 9 World Championships medals. She also won two Olympic medals in 2002, the bronze medal in downhill and the silver medal in the combined.

Career 
Götschl made her World Cup debut in 1993, on 14 March 1993, winning the slalom in Lillehammer, Norway. This was followed by more than 100 podium (top 3) results, including at least one win in four of the five disciplines; only a giant slalom win has eluded her, the best result in this discipline being a second place in Lienz in December 2003.

She won the overall World Cup title in 2000, and she has also won five World Cup discipline titles in downhill (1997, 1999, 2004, 2005 and 2007), three in super-G (2000, 2004 and 2007), and two in combined (2000 and 2002).

Götschl has won nine medals at the World Championships, including gold medals in combined (1997) in downhill (1999) and in team event (2007). At the 2002 Winter Olympics, she won a silver medal in combined and a bronze medal in the downhill.

On 28 January 2007, when she was second in a super-G in San Sicario, she celebrated her 100th podium in World Cup. Her total of 46 World Cup race wins (as of 14 March 2007) is fifth all-time among women, behind only Lindsey Vonn, Mikaela Shiffrin, Annemarie Moser-Pröll, and Vreni Schneider. One of her favorite slopes is in Cortina d'Ampezzo, Italy, where on 20 January 2007 she became the first alpine skier ever to win 10 races at a single World Cup venue. This highscore was held until December 2011 when Lindsey Vonn celebrated her ninth, tenth and eleventh victory on three consecutive days in Lake Louise, Canada.

World Cup statistics

Race wins 
 46 wins (24 DH / 17 SG / 1 SL / 4 KB)

Individual races 
 46 wins (24 DH / 17 SG / 1 SL / 4 KB)
 110 podiums (59 DH / 41 SG / 4 GS / 1 SL / 5 KB)
Regarding the most podium positions, Götschl ranks third to Annemarie Moser-Pröll, who leads with 113 and Lindsey Vonn.

Cup standings

World Championship results

Olympic results

References

External links
 
 

1975 births
Austrian female alpine skiers
Alpine skiers at the 1994 Winter Olympics
Alpine skiers at the 1998 Winter Olympics
Alpine skiers at the 2002 Winter Olympics
Alpine skiers at the 2006 Winter Olympics
Olympic alpine skiers of Austria
Medalists at the 2002 Winter Olympics
Olympic medalists in alpine skiing
Olympic silver medalists for Austria
Olympic bronze medalists for Austria
FIS Alpine Ski World Cup champions
People from Judenburg
Living people
Recipients of the Decoration of Honour for Services to the Republic of Austria
Sportspeople from Styria
20th-century Austrian women
21st-century Austrian women